The Reconstruction of Nations: Poland, Ukraine, Lithuania, Belarus, 1569–1999 is a 2003 book by Timothy Snyder. It focuses on the last few hundred  years of history of several Central and Eastern European countries.

References

2003 non-fiction books
History books about Eastern Europe